2-Chloro-m-cresol is a chlorinated cresol. The compound is difficult to synthesise as chlorination of m-cresol yields the para-product (4-chloro-3-methylphenol). Historically synthesis has been achieved via a para-selective nitration, followed by conversion to a diazonium compound and a Sandmeyer reaction to insert the chlorine into the 2-position.

References

Chlorobenzenes
Cresols